Ethelbert Ludlow Dudley (1818 – February 20, 1862) was a prominent Kentucky physician and a member of the faculty of Transylvania Medical School.

Early life
Dudley, the son of Ambrose Dudley, was born near Lexington, Kentucky. He was educated at Harvard University and Transylvania Medical School.

Medical career
Dudley studied under his famous uncle, Benjamin Dudley, at Transylvania Medical School; graduating in 1842 and joining the faculty. While at Transylvania, he held several positions including  chair of the department of General and Pathological Anatomy. Dudley originated and was editor of the Transylvania Medical Journal. Additionally, Dudley was on faculty at the newly formed Kentucky School of Medical and the United States Marine Hospital of Louisville.

Military service and death
In 1862, Dudley died of typhoid fever in Columbia, Kentucky. At the time of his death he was serving in the 21st Kentucky Infantry during the American Civil War. He was interred at Lexington Cemetery.

References

External links

1818 births
1862 deaths
Physicians from Kentucky
People of Kentucky in the American Civil War
Military personnel from Lexington, Kentucky
Harvard University alumni
Transylvania University alumni
Deaths from typhoid fever